This is a list of Buddhist temples, monasteries, stupas, and pagodas for which there are Wikipedia articles, sorted by location.

Australia

Bangladesh

Bhutan

Brazil
 Khadro Ling Buddhist Temple, Três Coroas, Rio Grande do Sul
 Zu Lai Temple, Cotia, São Paulo

Cambodia

Canada

Denmark 
 Havredal Zendo, Viborg

France

 Kagyu-Dzong, Paris
 Lerab Ling, Montpellier
 Pagode de Vincennes, Bois de Vincennes
 Plum Village Monastery
 Vajradhara-Ling and Temple for Peace, Aubry-le-Panthou, Normandy

Germany

 Das Buddhistische Haus (engl.: the Buddhist house; oldest Buddhist temple in Europe)
 German Dharmaduta Society
 Mahamevnawa Buddhist Monastery, (Theravada)

Greece
Kalachakra Stupa, in Karma Berchen Ling Buddhist Center, Lagkadaiika, Xylokastro

Hungary
 Hungarian Shaolin Temple
 Wonkwangsa International Zen Temple, Esztergom (Taego Order, Korean tradition)

India

Indonesia

Italy

 Ensoji il Cerchio (Soto Zen)
 Istituto Lama Tzong Khapa 
 Santacittarama Buddhist Monastery, Poggio Nativa (Theravada)

Japan

Laos

Luang Phrabang
 Wat Xieng Thong, Luang Phrabang

Vientiane
 Pha That Luang, Vientiane
 That Dam, Vientiane
 Wat Si Saket, Vientiane

Malaysia

Mongolia

Myanmar

Nepal

The Netherlands

New Zealand

 Fo Guang Shan Temple, Auckland, North Island

People's Republic of China

Philippines

Davao
 Lon Wa Buddhist Temple

Metro Manila
 Ocean Sky Chan Monastery, San Juan City, Metro Manila
 Seng Guan Temple, Divisoria, Tondo, Manila

Poland
 Drophan Ling

Republic of China (Taiwan)

 Chung Tai Chan Monastery, Nantou, the tallest Buddhist temple in the world. Height: 
 Dharma Drum Mountain, New Taipei City (Fa Gu Shan), international headquarters of Dharma Drum Mountain organization
 Fo Guang Shan Monastery, Kaohsiung
 Linji Huguo Chan Temple, Zhongshan District, Taipei
 Mengjia Longshan Temple, Wanhua District, Taipei
 Nung Chan Monastery, Beitou District, Taipei
 Shandao Temple, Zhongzheng District, Taipei
 Xiangde Temple, Xiulin Township, Hualien County
 Xuanzang Temple, Yuchih Township, Nantou County

Russia

Republic of Kalmykia
 Burkhan Bakshin Altan Sume
 Geden Sheddup Choikorling Monastery

Singapore

Slovenia
 Buddhist Congregation Dharmaling

Spain
 Benalmádena Stupa, Benalmádena
 Dag Shang Kagyü, Panillo, Huesca
 Sakya Tashi Ling, La Plana Novella, Olivella

South Africa
 Nan Hua Temple

South Korea

Sri Lanka

Sweden
 Buddharama Temple, Fredrika (Theravada)

Switzerland
 Tibet Institute Rikon, Zell (Tibetan)
 Wat Srinagarindravararam, Gretzenbach (Theravada)

Tanzania
 Tanzania Buddhist Temple and Meditation Center, Dar es Salaam

Thailand

Tibet

Uganda
 The Uganda Buddhist Centre, Kampala

United Kingdom

United States

Vietnam

See also

 Buddhist architecture
 Buddhist temple
 Kyaung
 Ordination hall
 Vihāra
 Wat

Notes

External links

 BuddhaNet's Comprehensive Directory of Buddhist Temples sorted by country
 Buddhactivity Dharma Centres database

 
Buddhist temples